Sambomorpha is a genus of beetles in the family Buprestidae, the jewel beetles. They are native to the Americas from Mexico to Brazil and Argentina.

These beetles are mostly black in color, but some species have purplish or blue casts.

Species include:

 Sambomorpha aeneifrons (Kerremans, 1896)
 Sambomorpha argentiniensis Cobos, 1959
 Sambomorpha blairi Obenberger, 1940
 Sambomorpha catharinae Obenberger, 1924
 Sambomorpha chiapas Bellamy, 1997
 Sambomorpha clarki Hespenheide, 1990
 Sambomorpha corona Bellamy, 2007
 Sambomorpha costarica Bellamy, 1997
 Sambomorpha occidentalis Bellamy, 1997
 Sambomorpha panama Bellamy, 2007
 Sambomorpha quintana Bellamy, 1997
 Sambomorpha vicina Obenberger, 1940

References

Buprestidae genera